Joseph Lyman (Joe) Fisher (January 11, 1914 – February 19, 1992) was a member of the United States House of Representatives from Virginia from 1975 to 1981 and a founder of Resources for the Future. A Democrat and lifelong Unitarian, Fisher was an active volunteer lay leader in the Unitarian Universalist Association, serving on the UUA's Board of Trustees and as moderator (the highest volunteer position in the UUA) from 1964 until 1977.

Private life
Fisher was born in Pawtucket, Rhode Island.  He attended Bowdoin College in Brunswick, Maine, and graduated in 1935 with an economic degree. He met Margaret "Peggy" Winslow on a blind date, in her home town of Indianapolis, on January 1, 1941. She was a sophomore at Wellesley College while he had begun graduate studies in economics at Harvard University. In April, Fisher proposed and a little more than a year later, on June 27, 1942, they were married. They had 3 daughters and 4 sons.

Professional career
After several years working at an accounting firm, Fisher was hired by the National Resource Planning Board in 1939. He was promoted to become an economist for the U.S. Department of State in 1942. He was drafted into the U.S. Army in 1943 to serve in World War II. Fisher returned to the United States after the war ended and earned a Ph.D. from Harvard University.  He was then hired by the Council of Economic Advisors and, after furthering his education at George Washington University, became the senior economist at this organization in 1951. In 1953, Fisher joined the efforts of a non-profit think tank known as Resources for the Future, Inc.

In 1974, Fisher was elected to Congress from Virginia's 10th congressional district in what was considered an upset, defeating long-serving incumbent Joel Broyhill. The district was based in the Washington D.C. suburbs and had been one of the first areas in Virginia to turn Republican. Fisher served for three terms until losing to Republican Frank Wolf in November 1980. He went on to establish the Economic Policy Department at The Wilderness Society, a U.S. non-governmental organization, bringing a first-of-its-kind professional scientific focus to the wildland conservation community. Afterward, Fisher was appointed Virginia Secretary of Human Resources in 1982 and then became an economics professor at George Mason University in 1986.

In addition to Fisher's role in the policy and public world, he was deeply involved in the community. Fisher served as chairman on the Arlington County Board, the Washington Metropolitan Transit Area (WMATA), president and chairman of the Washington Metropolitan Council of Governments, and moderator for the Board of Unitarian Universalist Association.

Fisher also wrote two books, including World Prospects for Natural Resources (1964) and Resources for America's Future (1963).

Death
In 1985 Fisher had back pain which was diagnosed as bone cancer and went into remission after treatments, but the cancer returned in early 1991. He died on February 19, 1992, in Arlington, Virginia, and his ashes where buried at Arlington National Cemetery beside two 2-star generals.

Archival Resources 
Fisher donated a collection of his records to the Special Collections Research Center at George Mason University. The collection is open and accessible to the public.

References

Fox, Stephen. "We Want No Straddlers." Wilderness 48.167 (1984): 5-19.

External links

 

1914 births
1992 deaths
Burials at Arlington National Cemetery
Politicians from Pawtucket, Rhode Island
Bowdoin College alumni
Harvard Graduate School of Arts and Sciences alumni
Democratic Party members of the United States House of Representatives from Virginia
American Unitarian Universalists
George Washington University alumni
George Washington University faculty
American Unitarians
20th-century American politicians
State cabinet secretaries of Virginia

Resources for the Future